Roger Majoral (born in Ille-sur-Têt on 12 August 1934) is a French former rugby league footballer. He played as second row.

Outside the field, he worked as a farmer.

Rugby union career 
He spent most of his sporting career for Ille and XIII Catalan,which with the latter he won the Lord Derby Cup in 1959 alongside the likes of André Casas, Yvon Gourbal and José Guasch. Thanks to his good club-level performances, he was capped three times for the France national team between 1958 and 1959.

Honours 
Champion of the Lord Derby Cup: 1959 (XIII Catalan)

International 

 France (3 caps) 1958-59

References

External links 

 Roger Majoral at rugbyleagueproject.com

Living people
1934 births
French rugby league players
Sportspeople from Pyrénées-Orientales
Rugby league second-rows
XIII Catalan players
France national rugby league team players